The Governor General's Bodyguard was a cavalry regiment of the British Indian Army. The regiment was, in effect, the Indian equivalent of the Household Cavalry of the British Army.

History
The regiment was first formed in 1773 as the Governor's Troop of Moghuls for the first Governor-General of India, Warren Hastings. It was composed of various contingents raised from various parts of India.

The regiment saw extensive service. In 1801 the regiment took part in the Egyptian campaign that removed a French force that had invaded Egypt. In 1811 the regiment was involved in the campaign to seize Java in the Dutch East Indies (now Indonesia) from the Dutch, which was successfully achieved (Java and other Dutch territories were not returned to the Dutch until 1816, after the conclusion of the Napoleonic Wars). In 1824 the First Burmese War began and the regiment took part in that conflict, winning the battle honour "Ava".

The regiment saw service in the Gwalior War of 1843, fighting at the Battle of Mahrajapore (29 December) that saw a British victory against the Mahrattas. The regiment saw extensive service in the First Sikh War in 1845.  This war saw the most battle honours awarded to the regiment in a single campaign. It was involved in the first engagement of that conflict, at Mudki (Moodkee), where the regiment's commanding officer, Lieutenant Charles Digby Dawkins, was killed. The regiment took part in the subsequent battles of the war; at Ferozeshah, Aliwal, and the last battle of the war, Sobraon. It was also active during the Indian Mutiny of 1857.

Transfer to the Crown
In 1858, when the Earl Canning became the first Viceroy of India upon the transfer of Indian rule from the British East India Company to the British Crown, the regiment also became formally known as the Viceroy's Bodyguard. The subsequent recruitment and selection was from various elite regiments and units of the British Indian Army. In 1885, the Third Burmese War, the last war between the British and Burmese, began and the regiment participated. In 1893, William Riddell Birdwood (later World War I General and 1st Baron Birdwood) became the Master Adjutant of the regiment, seeing service in a number of North-West Frontier expeditions, with his home (regimental) base in Dehradun.

Clothing 
Clothing regulations of 1913 were as below:

Uniform: red; facings blue. Badges and Device:  On buttons —
 British officers.— burnished, with the Royal and Imperial Cypher in a Garter, bearing the motto of the Order of tho Garter, and a Tudor crown above.
 Indian officers.— Brass, with crossed lances ; Tudor crown in upper angle, and "G. G. B. G." across the lower angle. 
On field cap, —  A Tudor crown in gold embroidery.  On forage cap. — Tudor crown surmounted by a lion, passant, regardant, in gold ombvoidery.  On pouch. — In gold embroidery the monogram "G. G. B. G." surmounted by a Tudor crown.  On pouch belt. — Gilt burnished, side prickers and chains.

World War I and II
In the First World War, men of the regiment were deployed to the Middle East in the fight against the German allied Ottoman Empire, seeing service in Mesopotamia (now Iraq).

In 1944, the regiment became a mechanised one, though retaining a ceremonial mounted squadron. The regiment subsequently re-roled as an airborne unit and joined the 44th Indian Airborne Division, being renamed the 44th Indian Airborne Division Reconnaissance Squadron (Governor General's Bodyguard) It would retain the name until sometime after the war, when it reverted to its former name.

Independence
In 1947, the Partition of India saw the country of Pakistan established and Muslim personnel from the regiment were transferred to the Pakistani Army to form the Governor General's Bodyguard, Pakistan.  The rest of the regiment remained with the Indian Army as the President's Bodyguard upon India proclaiming itself a republic in 1950.

Battle honours
Java
Ava
Mahrajapore
Moodkee
Ferozeshah
Aliwal
Sobraon

See also
 President's Bodyguard (India)
 President's Bodyguard (Pakistan)
 Household Cavalry

References

Military units and formations established in 1773
Military units and formations disestablished in 1950
British Indian Army regiments
British Indian Army cavalry regiments
Indian World War I regiments
Indian World War II regiments